Headrick is a town in Jackson County, Oklahoma, United States. The population was 94 at the 2010 census, down from 130 in 2000.

Geography
Headrick is located in eastern Jackson County at  (34.626785, -99.138715).

Demographics

As of the census of 2000, there were 130 people, 49 households, and 39 families residing in the town. There were 62 housing units at an average density of 293.2 per square mile (114.0/km2). The racial makeup of the town was 82.31% White, 4.62% Native American, 0.77% Pacific Islander, 10.77% from other races, and 1.54% from two or more races. Hispanic or Latino of any race were 13.08% of the population.

There were 49 households, out of which 36.7% had children under the age of 18 living with them, 67.3% were married couples living together, 10.2% had a female householder with no husband present, and 20.4% were non-families. 18.4% of all households were made up of individuals, and 8.2% had someone living alone who was 65 years of age or older. The average household size was 2.65 and the average family size was 3.00.

In the town, the population was spread out, with 25.4% under the age of 18, 8.5% from 18 to 24, 23.8% from 25 to 44, 29.2% from 45 to 64, and 13.1% who were 65 years of age or older. The median age was 38 years. For every 100 females, there were 116.7 males. For every 100 females age 18 and over, there were 106.4 males.

The median income for a household in the town was $28,125, and the median income for a family was $23,750. Males had a median income of $30,000 versus $15,893 for females. The per capita income for the town was $11,388. There were 27.3% of families and 25.0% of the population living below the poverty line, including 32.4% of under eighteens and 21.1% of those over 64.

References

External links
 

Towns in Jackson County, Oklahoma
Towns in Oklahoma